Pya may refer to:

 pya, a unit of currency, a division of the Burmese kyat 
 Pya, Mingin, a village in Burma
 PYa, MP-443 Grach, a Russian pistol designated PYa
PYA, Pakistan Yachting Association, former name of the Pakistan Sailing Federation
PYA/Monarch, US Foods
 Pouya Cargo Air (ICAO airline code: PYA)
 Velasquez Airport (IATA airport code: PYA), see List of airports in Colombia